Robert Ellison may refer to:

 Robert Ellison (politician) (1614–1678), English politician 
 Robert Ellison (British Army officer) (1783–1843), British soldier of the Napoleonic Era who fought at the Battle of Waterloo
 Robert Ellison (Roman Catholic bishop) (born 1942), Roman Catholic Bishop of the Diocese of Banjul, Gambia
 Robert Lee "Skip" Ellison, Druid priest, liturgist and author
Bob Ellison, screenwriter

See also
Ellison (surname)